Urban Male Magazine (a.k.a. UMM) was a Canadian men's interest magazine created and operated by Abbis Mahmoud, an Ontario entrepreneur that also operates several nightclubs like Lobby, Mansion, Tila Tequila, Buddha Bar, Tequila Jacks and the Brunswick House. The magazine was launched in 1998 and published its last issue in 2013.

See also
 List of men's magazines

References

External links
 Urban Male Magazine

1998 establishments in Ontario
2013 disestablishments in Ontario
Bi-monthly magazines published in Canada
Defunct magazines published in Canada
Magazines established in 1998
Magazines disestablished in 2013
Magazines published in Ottawa
Men's magazines published in Canada